Louis Anthony Proietti (born May 27, 1983) is an American baseball coach and former shortstop. Proietti played college baseball at Saint Peter's in 2004, Potomac State College of West Virginia University in 2005 and at University of Massachusetts Amherst from 2006 to 2007 for coach Mike Stone. He then served as the head coach of the Saint Peter's Peacocks (2020–2022).

Proietti was born in Hamilton, Ontario. He attended Berkshire Preparatory School in Sheffield, Massachusetts. After graduation from high school, he decided to attend Saint Peter's University to play baseball. After his freshman year, he left Saint Peter's to play junior college baseball for Potomac State College in West Virginia. After his sophomore year, he committed to play for UMass. He concluded his career after the 2007 season.

In 2019, Proietti was named the head coach of the Saint Peter's Peacocks baseball program. Proietti stepped away from the Peacocks following the 2022 season.

References

External links
UMass Minuteman profile
Saint Peter's Peacocks profile

1983 births
Living people
Baseball shortstops
Baseball players from Hamilton, Ontario
Saint Peter's Peacocks baseball players
Potomac State Catamounts baseball players
UMass Minutemen baseball players
McMaster Marauders baseball coaches
Rider Broncs baseball coaches
Stonehill Skyhawks baseball coaches
Saint Peter's Peacocks baseball coaches